Dovesville is an unincorporated community and census-designated place (CDP) in Darlington County, South Carolina, United States. It was first listed as a CDP prior to the 2020 census. Per the 2020 census, the population was 827.

The CDP is in northeastern Darlington County, along U.S. Routes 52 and 401. The concurrent highway leads north  to Society Hill and south the same distance to Darlington, the county seat.

The southwest border of the CDP follows Black Creek, a southeast-flowing tributary of the Great Pee Dee River, while the eastern border follows Horse Creek, a south-flowing tributary of Black Creek. Jeffords Millpond is an impoundment on Horse Creek in the northeast corner of the community.

Demographics

2020 census

Note: the US Census treats Hispanic/Latino as an ethnic category. This table excludes Latinos from the racial categories and assigns them to a separate category. Hispanics/Latinos can be of any race.

References 

Census-designated places in Darlington County, South Carolina
Census-designated places in South Carolina